Brezje pri Bojsnem is a small settlement to the north of Bojsno in the Municipality of Brežice in eastern Slovenia. The area is part of the traditional region of Styria. It is now included in the Lower Sava Statistical Region.

Name
The name of the settlement was changed from Brezje to Brezje pri Bojsnem in 1953. In the past the German name was Bresje.

Church
The local church is dedicated to Saint Ulrich and belongs to the Parish of Pišece. It is a small church with a rectangular floor plan, a semi-circular apse, and a belfry over its main entrance. It was built in the 19th century.

References

External links
Brezje pri Bojsnem on Geopedia

Populated places in the Municipality of Brežice